Shizuko Sakashita (8 December 1933 – 17 May 1972) was a Japanese gymnast. She competed in seven events at the 1956 Summer Olympics. Sakashita committed suicide by gas poisoning in 1972.

References

External links
 

1933 births
1972 suicides
Japanese female artistic gymnasts
Olympic gymnasts of Japan
Gymnasts at the 1956 Summer Olympics
Place of birth missing
Sportspeople from Toyama Prefecture
Suicides by gas
Suicides in Japan
1972 deaths
20th-century Japanese women